The 2008 Italian general election took place on 13–14 April 2008. The election was won in Friuli-Venezia Giulia by the centre-right coalition between The People of Freedom and Lega Nord, as it happened at the national level. The People of Freedom was the largest party in the election with 34.7%, ahead of the Democratic Party (31.4%) and Lega Nord (13.0%).

Results

Chamber of Deputies

|-
|- style="background-color:#E9E9E9"
! rowspan="1" style="text-align:left;vertical-align:top;" |Coalition leader
! rowspan="1" style="text-align:center;vertical-align:top;" |votes
! rowspan="1" style="text-align:center;vertical-align:top;" |votes (%)
! rowspan="1" style="text-align:center;vertical-align:top;" |seats
! rowspan="1" style="text-align:left;vertical-align:top;" |Party
! rowspan="1" style="text-align:center;vertical-align:top;" |votes
! rowspan="1" style="text-align:center;vertical-align:top;" |votes (%)
! rowspan="1" style="text-align:center;vertical-align:top;" |seats
|-
! rowspan="2" style="text-align:left;vertical-align:top;" |Silvio Berlusconi
| rowspan="2" style="vertical-align:top;" |364,484
| rowspan="2" style="vertical-align:top;" |47.7
| rowspan="2" style="vertical-align:top;" |7

| style="text-align:left;" |The People of Freedom
| style="vertical-align:top;" |264,988
| style="vertical-align:top;" |32.7
| style="vertical-align:top;" |5
|-
| style="text-align:left;" |Lega Nord
| style="vertical-align:top;" |99,496
| style="vertical-align:top;" |13.0
| style="vertical-align:top;" |2

|-
! rowspan="2" style="text-align:left;vertical-align:top;" |Walter Veltroni
| rowspan="2" style="vertical-align:top;" |272,092
| rowspan="2" style="vertical-align:top;" |35.6
| rowspan="2" style="vertical-align:top;" |5

| style="text-align:left;" |Democratic Party
| style="vertical-align:top;" |239,346
| style="vertical-align:top;" |31.4
| style="vertical-align:top;" |4
|-
| style="text-align:left;" |Italy of Values
| style="vertical-align:top;" |32,746
| style="vertical-align:top;" |4.3
| style="vertical-align:top;" |1

|-
! rowspan="1" style="text-align:left;vertical-align:top;" |Pier Ferdinando Casini
| rowspan="1" style="vertical-align:top;" |46,051
| rowspan="1" style="vertical-align:top;" |6.0
| rowspan="1" style="vertical-align:top;" |1

| style="text-align:left;" |Union of the Centre
| style="vertical-align:top;" |46,051
| style="vertical-align:top;" |6.0
| style="vertical-align:top;" |1

|-
! rowspan="1" style="text-align:left;vertical-align:top;" |Fausto Bertinotti
| rowspan="1" style="vertical-align:top;" |23,278
| rowspan="1" style="vertical-align:top;" |3.1
| rowspan="1" style="vertical-align:top;" |-

| style="text-align:left;" |The Left – The Rainbow
| style="vertical-align:top;" |23,278
| style="vertical-align:top;" |3.1
| style="vertical-align:top;" |-

|-
! rowspan="1" style="text-align:left;vertical-align:top;" |Daniela Santanchè
| rowspan="1" style="vertical-align:top;" |22,585
| rowspan="1" style="vertical-align:top;" |3.0
| rowspan="1" style="vertical-align:top;" |-

| style="text-align:left;" |The Right
| style="vertical-align:top;" |22,585
| style="vertical-align:top;" |3.0
| style="vertical-align:top;" |-

|-
! rowspan="1" style="text-align:left;vertical-align:top;" |Renzo Rabellino
| rowspan="1" style="vertical-align:top;" |8,403
| rowspan="1" style="vertical-align:top;" |1.1
| rowspan="1" style="vertical-align:top;" |-

| style="text-align:left;" |List of Talking Crickets
| style="vertical-align:top;" |8,403
| style="vertical-align:top;" |1.1
| style="vertical-align:top;" |-

|-
! rowspan="1" style="text-align:left;vertical-align:top;" |Enrico Boselli
| rowspan="1" style="vertical-align:top;" |4,271
| rowspan="1" style="vertical-align:top;" |0.6
| rowspan="1" style="vertical-align:top;" |-

| style="text-align:left;" |Socialist Party
| style="vertical-align:top;" |4,271
| style="vertical-align:top;" |0.6
| style="vertical-align:top;" |-

|-
! rowspan="1" style="text-align:left;vertical-align:top;" |Marco Ferrando
| rowspan="1" style="vertical-align:top;" |3,882
| rowspan="1" style="vertical-align:top;" |0.5
| rowspan="1" style="vertical-align:top;" |-

| style="text-align:left;" |Workers' Communist Party
| style="vertical-align:top;" |3,882
| style="vertical-align:top;" |0.5
| style="vertical-align:top;" |-

|-
! rowspan="1" style="text-align:left;vertical-align:top;" |Flavia D'Angeli
| rowspan="1" style="vertical-align:top;" |3,609
| rowspan="1" style="vertical-align:top;" |0.5
| rowspan="1" style="vertical-align:top;" |-

| style="text-align:left;" |Critical Left
| style="vertical-align:top;" |3,609
| style="vertical-align:top;" |0.5
| style="vertical-align:top;" |-

|-
! rowspan="1" style="text-align:left;vertical-align:top;" |Others
| rowspan="1" style="vertical-align:top;" |14,303
| rowspan="1" style="vertical-align:top;" |1.9
| rowspan="1" style="vertical-align:top;" |-

| style="text-align:left;" |others
| style="vertical-align:top;" |14,303
| style="vertical-align:top;" |1.9
| style="vertical-align:top;" |-

|-
|- style="background-color:#E9E9E9"
! rowspan="1" style="text-align:left;vertical-align:top;" |Total coalitions
! rowspan="1" style="text-align:right;vertical-align:top;" |762,958
! rowspan="1" style="text-align:right;vertical-align:top;" |100.0
! rowspan="1" style="text-align:right;vertical-align:top;" |13
! rowspan="1" style="text-align:left;vertical-align:top;" |Total parties
! rowspan="1" style="text-align:right;vertical-align:top;" |762,958
! rowspan="1" style="text-align:right;vertical-align:top;" |100.0
! rowspan="1" style="text-align:right;vertical-align:top;" |13

Source: Ministry of the Interior

Senate

|-
|- style="background-color:#E9E9E9"
! rowspan="1" style="text-align:left;vertical-align:top;" |Coalition leader
! rowspan="1" style="text-align:center;vertical-align:top;" |votes
! rowspan="1" style="text-align:center;vertical-align:top;" |votes (%)
! rowspan="1" style="text-align:center;vertical-align:top;" |seats
! rowspan="1" style="text-align:left;vertical-align:top;" |Party
! rowspan="1" style="text-align:center;vertical-align:top;" |votes
! rowspan="1" style="text-align:center;vertical-align:top;" |votes (%)
! rowspan="1" style="text-align:center;vertical-align:top;" |seats
|-
! rowspan="2" style="text-align:left;vertical-align:top;" |Silvio Berlusconi
| rowspan="2" style="vertical-align:top;" |345,693
| rowspan="2" style="vertical-align:top;" |48.5
| rowspan="2" style="vertical-align:top;" |4

| style="text-align:left;" |The People of Freedom
| style="vertical-align:top;" |253,000
| style="vertical-align:top;" |35.5
| style="vertical-align:top;" |3
|-
| style="text-align:left;" |Lega Nord
| style="vertical-align:top;" |92,693
| style="vertical-align:top;" |13.0
| style="vertical-align:top;" |1

|-
! rowspan="2" style="text-align:left;vertical-align:top;" |Walter Veltroni
| rowspan="2" style="vertical-align:top;" |257,807
| rowspan="2" style="vertical-align:top;" |36.1
| rowspan="2" style="vertical-align:top;" |3

| style="text-align:left;" |Democratic Party
| style="vertical-align:top;" |227,730
| style="vertical-align:top;" |31.9
| style="vertical-align:top;" |3
|-
| style="text-align:left;" |Italy of Values
| style="vertical-align:top;" |30,077
| style="vertical-align:top;" |4.2
| style="vertical-align:top;" |-

|-
! rowspan="1" style="text-align:left;vertical-align:top;" |Pier Ferdinando Casini
| rowspan="1" style="vertical-align:top;" |42,956
| rowspan="1" style="vertical-align:top;" |6.0
| rowspan="1" style="vertical-align:top;" |-

| style="text-align:left;" |Union of the Centre
| style="vertical-align:top;" |42,956
| style="vertical-align:top;" |6.0
| style="vertical-align:top;" |-

|-
! rowspan="1" style="text-align:left;vertical-align:top;" |Fausto Bertinotti
| rowspan="1" style="vertical-align:top;" |21,369
| rowspan="1" style="vertical-align:top;" |3.0
| rowspan="1" style="vertical-align:top;" |-

| style="text-align:left;" |The Left – The Rainbow
| style="vertical-align:top;" |21,369
| style="vertical-align:top;" |3.0
| style="vertical-align:top;" |-

|-
! rowspan="1" style="text-align:left;vertical-align:top;" |Daniela Santanchè
| rowspan="1" style="vertical-align:top;" |17,424
| rowspan="1" style="vertical-align:top;" |2.4
| rowspan="1" style="vertical-align:top;" |-

| style="text-align:left;" |The Right
| style="vertical-align:top;" |17,424
| style="vertical-align:top;" |2.4
| style="vertical-align:top;" |-

|-
! rowspan="1" style="text-align:left;vertical-align:top;" |Renzo Rabellino
| rowspan="1" style="vertical-align:top;" |7,494
| rowspan="1" style="vertical-align:top;" |1.1
| rowspan="1" style="vertical-align:top;" |-

| style="text-align:left;" |List of Talking Crickets
| style="vertical-align:top;" |7,494
| style="vertical-align:top;" |1.1
| style="vertical-align:top;" |-

|-
! rowspan="1" style="text-align:left;vertical-align:top;" |Enrico Boselli
| rowspan="1" style="vertical-align:top;" |3,762
| rowspan="1" style="vertical-align:top;" |0.5
| rowspan="1" style="vertical-align:top;" |-

| style="text-align:left;" |Socialist Party
| style="vertical-align:top;" |3,762
| style="vertical-align:top;" |0.5
| style="vertical-align:top;" |-

|-
! rowspan="1" style="text-align:left;vertical-align:top;" |Others
| rowspan="1" style="vertical-align:top;" |12,833
| rowspan="1" style="vertical-align:top;" |1.8
| rowspan="1" style="vertical-align:top;" |-

| style="text-align:left;" |others
| style="vertical-align:top;" |12,833
| style="vertical-align:top;" |1.8
| style="vertical-align:top;" |-

|-
|- style="background-color:#E9E9E9"
! rowspan="1" style="text-align:left;vertical-align:top;" |Total coalitions
! rowspan="1" style="text-align:right;vertical-align:top;" |713,193
! rowspan="1" style="text-align:right;vertical-align:top;" |100.0
! rowspan="1" style="text-align:right;vertical-align:top;" |7
! rowspan="1" style="text-align:left;vertical-align:top;" |Total parties
! rowspan="1" style="text-align:right;vertical-align:top;" |713,193
! rowspan="1" style="text-align:right;vertical-align:top;" |100.0
! rowspan="1" style="text-align:right;vertical-align:top;" |7

Source: Ministry of the Interior

MPs elected in Friuli-Venezia Giulia

Chamber of Deputies

The People of Freedom
Franco Frattini
Roberto Menia
Roberto Antonione
Isidoro Gottardo
Manlio Contento

Democratic Party
Alessandro Maran
Ivano Strizzolo
Ettore Rosato
Maria Antonietta Coscioni

Lega Nord
Fulvio Follegot
Massimiliano Fedriga

Italy of Values
Carlo Monai

Union of the Centre
Angelo Compagnon

Senate

The People of Freedom
Giulio Camber
Giovanni Collino
Ferruccio Saro

Democratic Party
Carlo Pegorer
Tamara Blažina
Flavio Pertoldi

Lega Nord
Mario Pittoni

Elections in Friuli-Venezia Giulia
2008 elections in Italy
April 2008 events in Europe